Air Chief Marshal Hugh Caswall Tremenheere Dowding, 1st Baron Dowding,  (24 April 1882 – 15 February 1970) was an officer in the Royal Air Force. He was Air Officer Commanding RAF Fighter Command during the Battle of Britain and is generally credited with playing a crucial role in Britain's defence, and hence, the defeat of Adolf Hitler's plan to invade Britain.

Born in Moffat, Scotland, Dowding was an officer in the British Army in the 1900s and early 1910s. He joined the Royal Flying Corps at the start of the First World War and went on to serve as a fighter pilot and then as commanding officer of No. 16 Squadron. During the inter-war years he became Air Officer Commanding Fighting Area, Air Defence of Great Britain and then joined the Air Council as Air Member for Supply and Research. In July 1936, Dowding was appointed chief of the newly created RAF Fighter Command.

During the Battle of Britain in the Second World War, Dowding's Fighter Command successfully defended the UK against the attacks of the Luftwaffe, thanks to his prudent management of RAF resources and detailed preparation of Britain's air defences (the Dowding system). He subsequently came into conflict with proponents of the Big Wing tactic, most notably Trafford Leigh-Mallory and Douglas Bader, which along with the inadaquecies of RAF's nighttime defence during the Blitz led to his eventual downfall. In November 1940, Dowding was replaced in command against his wishes by Sholto Douglas, another Big Wing advocate.

Dowding retired from the Royal Air Force in July 1942 and was made a peer in June 1943. Upon retirement, Dowding subsequently became an influential member of the British spiritualist, theosophical, and animal rights movements. He died on 15 February 1970, aged 87.

Early life
Dowding was born at St. Ninian's Boys' Preparatory School in Moffat, Dumfriesshire, the son of Arthur John Caswall Dowding and Maud Caroline Dowding (née Tremenheere). His father had taught at Fettes College in Edinburgh before moving to Moffat. Dowding was educated at St Ninian's School and Winchester College. He trained at the Royal Military Academy, Woolwich before being commissioned as a second lieutenant in the Royal Garrison Artillery on 18 August 1900.

Military career
Promoted to lieutenant on 8 May 1902, Dowding served with the Royal Garrison Artillery at Gibraltar, in Ceylon and in Hong Kong before being posted to No. 7 Mountain Artillery Battery in India in 1904. After returning to the United Kingdom, he attended the Army Staff College 1912 before being promoted to captain on 18 August 1913 and being posted with the Royal Garrison Artillery on the Isle of Wight later that year. After becoming interested in aviation, Dowding gained Aviator's Certificate no. 711 on 19 December 1913 in a Vickers biplane at the Vickers School of Flying, Brooklands. He then attended the Central Flying School, where he was awarded his wings.  Although added to the Reserve List of the Royal Flying Corps (RFC), Dowding returned to the Isle of Wight to resume his Royal Garrison Artillery duties.  However, this arrangement was short lived and in August 1914, he joined the RFC as a pilot on No. 7 Squadron.

First World War
Dowding transferred to No. 6 Squadron in October 1914 and then, after two weeks as a staff officer in France, became a Flight Commander, first with No. 9 Squadron and then with No. 6 Squadron. He became commanding officer of the Wireless Experimental Establishment at Brooklands in March 1915 and went on to be commanding officer of No. 16 Squadron in July 1915, which was based at La Gorgue in northern France.  After the Battle of the Somme, Dowding clashed with General Hugh Trenchard, the commander of the RFC, over the need to give pilots some rest and recuperation. In September 1915 Duncan Grinnell-Milne joined No 16 squadron as a junior pilot. Years later he published an account of his time in the squadron, in which he criticises Dowding as being "too reserved and aloof from his juniors", although efficient. Promoted to major on 30 December 1915, Dowding was recalled to England in January 1916, and, having been promoted to temporary lieutenant colonel on 1 February 1916 was given command of 7 Wing at Farnborough later that month. He transferred to the command of 9 Wing at Fienvillers in June 1916. Returning to England, he was promoted to temporary colonel on 1 January 1917 on appointment as commander of the Southern Group Command and promoted to temporary brigadier-general on 23 June 1917 before being given command of the southern training brigade in August 1917. He was sent to York as chief staff officer to the RAF's senior administrative officer in the area in April 1918. He was appointed a Companion of the Order of St Michael and St George on 1 January 1919.

Inter-war years
Dowding was given a permanent commission in the RAF on 1 August 1919 with the rank of group captain. He commanded No. 16 Group from October 1919 and then No. 1 Group from February 1920 where he was responsible for organising two of the annual air displays at Hendon. He was promoted to air commodore on 1 January 1922, and served as chief staff officer at Inland Area headquarters at Uxbridge from February 1922 before being appointed Chief Staff Officer for RAF Iraq Command in August 1924.

Dowding was an accomplished skier, winner of the first ever National Slalom Championship, and president of the Ski Club of Great Britain from 1924 to 1925.

In May 1926 Dowding was appointed director of training at the Air Ministry. He was appointed a Companion of the Order of the Bath on 2 January 1928 and promoted to air vice-marshal on 1 January 1929. Trenchard sent him to Palestine and Transjordan to study security problems caused by Arab–Jewish unrest: his reports, which gained Trenchard's approval, were a cause of further career advancement. Dowding became Air Officer Commanding Fighting Area, Air Defence of Great Britain in December 1929 and then joined the Air Council as Air Member for Supply and Research in September 1930.  One of his first responsibilities in this post was the approval of the granting of a certificate of airworthiness to the R101 airship shortly before it set off on its ill-fated voyage to India; he later said  "I think I was wrong not to insist on much more extensive trials and tests" and that his decision had been based on optimistic technical advice. Dowding's time in this office coincided with a period of rapid development in aircraft design and a growing fear that another major war was on the horizon. Although without scientific or technical training, he displayed a great capacity for understanding technical matters. He was promoted to air marshal on 1 January 1933 and advanced to Knight Commander of the Order of the Bath on 3 June 1933.

In July 1936 Dowding was appointed commanding officer of the newly created RAF Fighter Command, and was perhaps the one important person in Britain, and perhaps the world, who did not agree with British Prime Minister Stanley Baldwin's 1932 declaration that "The bomber will always get through". He conceived and oversaw the development of the "Dowding system". This consisted of an integrated air defence system which included (i) radar (whose potential Dowding was among the first to appreciate), (ii) human observers (including the Royal Observer Corps), who filled crucial gaps in what radar was capable of detecting at the time (the early radar systems, for example, did not provide accurate information on the altitude of incoming German aircraft), (iii) raid plotting, and (iv) radio control of aircraft. The whole network was linked in many cases by dedicated telephone cables buried sufficiently deeply to provide protection against bombing. The network had its centre at RAF Bentley Priory, a converted country house on the outskirts of London. The system as a whole later became known as Ground-controlled interception (GCI).

Dowding also brought modern aircraft into service during the pre-war period, including the eight gun Spitfire and Hurricane. He is also credited with having fought the Air Ministry so that fighters were equipped with bullet-proof wind shields. He was promoted to air chief marshal on 1 January 1937 and appointed a Knight Grand Cross of the Royal Victorian Order on 23 January 1937.

Second World War

Battle of Britain

At the time of his retirement in June 1939, Dowding was asked to stay on until March 1940 because of the tense international situation. He was again permitted to continue serving through the Battle of Britain, first until July and finally until November 1940. In 1940, Dowding, nicknamed "Stuffy" by his men for his alleged lack of humour, proved unwilling to sacrifice aircraft and pilots in the attempt to aid Allied troops during the Battle of France. He, along with his immediate superior Sir Cyril Newall, then Chief of the Air Staff, resisted repeated requests from Winston Churchill to weaken the home defence by sending precious squadrons to France. When the Allied resistance in France collapsed, he worked closely with Air Vice-Marshal Keith Park, the commander of 11 Fighter Group, in organising cover for the evacuation of the British Expeditionary Force at Dunkirk.

Through the summer and autumn of 1940 in the Battle of Britain, Dowding's Fighter Command resisted the attacks of the Luftwaffe. Beyond the critical importance of the overall system of integrated air defence which he had developed for Fighter Command, his major contribution was to marshal resources behind the scenes (including replacement aircraft and air crew) and to maintain a significant fighter reserve, while leaving his subordinate commanders' hands largely free to run the battle in detail.

Dowding was known for his humility and great sincerity. Fighter Command pilots came to characterise Dowding as one who cared for his men and had their best interests at heart. Dowding often referred to his "dear fighter boys" as his "chicks": indeed his son Derek was one of them. Because of his brilliant detailed preparation of Britain's air defences for the German assault, and his prudent management of his resources during the battle, Dowding is today generally given the credit for Britain's victory in the Battle of Britain.

Dowding's subsequent downfall has been attributed by some to his singlemindedness and perceived lack of diplomacy and political savoir faire in dealing with intra-RAF challenges and intrigues, most obviously the still, even now, hotly debated Big Wing controversy in which a number of senior and active service officers had argued in favour of large set-piece air battles with the Luftwaffe as an alternative to Dowding's successful Fabian strategy. Another reason often cited for his removal, but characterised by some contemporary commentators more as a pretext, was the difficulty of countering German nighttime bombing raids on British cities. The account of radar pioneer, E. G. Bowen in Radar Days (1987) rebuts the claim that Dowding's grasp of the problems of British night fighters was inadequate. He suggests that if Dowding had been left to follow his own path, the ultimately effective British response to night bombing (which depended completely on developments in air-borne radar) would have come somewhat sooner. Dowding himself showed that he had a good grasp of night fighter defence and was planning a defence system against night bombing in a letter he wrote some time after the Battle of Britain. However, there was great political and public pressure during the Blitz for something to be done, and Fighter Command's existing resources without, as yet, airborne radar, proved woefully inadequate. A committee of enquiry chaired by Sir John Salmond produced a long list of recommendations to improve night air defence; when Dowding approved only some of them, his erstwhile supporters, Lord Beaverbrook and Churchill, decided that it was time for him to step down.

Dowding was advanced to Knight Grand Cross of the Order of the Bath on 8 October 1940. He unwillingly relinquished command on 24 November 1940 and was replaced by Big Wing advocate Sholto Douglas. Churchill tried to soften the blow by putting him in charge of the British Air Mission to the US, responsible for the procurement of new aircraft types.

Publication of his book Twelve Legions of Angels was suppressed in November 1941. The British Government considered that it contained information which might be of use to the Germans. The book was finally published in 1946, soon after the war ended.

Ministry of Aircraft Production
After leaving Fighter Command, Dowding was sent on special duty to the United States for the Ministry of Aircraft Production, but there he made himself unpopular with his outspokenness. On his return he headed a study into economies of RAF manpower before retiring from the Royal Air Force in July 1942. He was elevated to the peerage, as Baron Dowding of Bentley Priory on 2 June 1943.

Later life

Later in life, because of his belief that he was unjustly treated by the RAF, Dowding became increasingly bitter. The RAF passed him over for promotion to Marshal of the Royal Air Force.

He approved Robert Wright's book Dowding and the Battle of Britain which argued that a conspiracy of Big Wing proponents, including Trafford Leigh-Mallory and Douglas Bader, had engineered his sacking from Fighter Command.

In 1951, Dowding laid the foundation stone of the Chapel of St George at RAF Biggin Hill, now London Biggin Hill Airport, in memory of fallen airmen.

Dowding and his second wife Baroness Dowding were both anti-vivisectionists and in 1973 Britain's National Anti-Vivisection Society founded the Lord Dowding Fund for Humane Research in his honour.

Spiritualism
In his retirement, Dowding became actively interested in Spiritualism, both as a writer and speaker. His first book on the subject, Many Mansions, was written in 1943, followed by Lychgate (1945), The Dark Star and God's Magic. Rejecting conventional Christianity, he joined the Theosophical Society which advocated belief in reincarnation. He wrote of meeting dead "RAF boys" in his sleep – spirits who flew fighters from mountain-top runways made of light. Dowding became a vegetarian, based on his beliefs as a theosophist and spiritualist.  Although he was a vegetarian, he believed that "animals will be killed to satisfy human needs for many a long day to come", and he made several appeals in the House of Lords for the humane killing of animals intended for food. He was also a member of the Fairy Investigation Society. Although he knew that people considered him a crank for his belief in fairies, Dowding believed that fairies "are essential to the growth of plants and the welfare of the vegetable kingdom".

H.D.

The American poet Hilda Doolittle attended Dowding's lectures in London and struck up a correspondence with him. H.D. became convinced that she could hear the voices of Dowding's fallen crewmen during her Spiritualist work, believing them to be warning her of the impending dangers of atomic warfare. Dowding rebuked H.D. for performing seances unaccompanied (which he believed to be dangerous), and for her perceived lack of caution, as Dowding felt that these spirits were "of a lower order": i.e. deceptive, malevolent entities. H.D. continued these activities until Dowding finally cut off all contact with her. This rejection precipitated H.D.'s brief mental breakdown in 1946. In the decade after this breakdown, H.D. wrote two dense, esoteric book-length poems - Helen in Egypt and Vale Ave - which detail the psychological impact this rejection had on her, and the process of recovering from it.  H.D. also wrote a sequence of novels about her experiences with Dowding, almost all of which went unpublished in her lifetime, including Majic Ring and The Sword Went Out To Sea.

Death
Dowding died at his home in Royal Tunbridge Wells, Kent, on 15 February 1970. His body was cremated and his ashes were placed below the Battle of Britain Memorial Window in the Royal Air Force chapel in Westminster Abbey. Dowding's son Derek (1919–1992) inherited the title of Baron Dowding.

Personal life
Dowding married Clarice Maud Vancourt, the daughter of an officer in the Indian Army, on 16 February 1918. She had one child from a previous marriage, Marjorie Brenda Williams (1911–2003) and they had one child together, Derek Hugh Tremenheere (1919–1992). Clarice died in 1920, and Dowding's sister Hilda helped Dowding look after the two children.

Dowding married Muriel Whiting on 25 September 1951; they had no children.

Media portrayals

In the 1940s and 1950s, H.D. wrote several novels, memoirs, and book-length poems about Dowding.

In the 1956 film Reach for the Sky, Dowding was played by Charles Carson.

In the 1969 film Battle of Britain, Dowding was played by Laurence Olivier. Olivier had himself served as a pilot in the Royal Navy's Fleet Air Arm during World War II. During filming in summer 1968, 86 years old and wheel-chair-bound by severe arthritis, Dowding visited the set at Hawkinge airfield in Kent. Olivier told Dowding he had sat behind the latter's desk all day "pretending to be you" and was "making an awful mess of it too", to which Dowding replied, "Oh, I'm sure you are." The crew and Olivier broke into laughter. Footage of this can be seen in the special features section of the film's Special Edition DVD.

In the 2017 film Darkest Hour, Dowding was played by Adrian Rawlins.

In the 2018 film Hurricane: 303 Squadron, Dowding was played by Nicholas Farrell.

Honours and tributes

A statue of Dowding stands outside St Clement Danes church on the Strand, London. The inscription reads:

Other monuments to Dowding can be found in Station Park in Moffat, the town of his birth, and in Calverley Gardens in Tunbridge Wells where he died. The RAF Association in conjunction with the RAF Benevolent Fund, purchased his birthplace, the former St Ninian's School, Moffat; the building was renamed Dowding House and restored to provide sheltered housing for former members of the Royal Air Force or their dependents.

The Dowding Centre at the School of Aerospace Battle Management (formerly the School of Fighter Control) at RAF Boulmer is named after Dowding.

A green ceramic commemorative plaque was unveiled at his former residence (1951–1967) in Darnley Drive, Southborough on 6 May 2012.

Dowding Place, Stanmore, the site of former RAF Stanmore Park is named after him.

The 1946-built Southern Railway Battle of Britain pacific (4-6-2) locomotive 21C152 was named Lord Dowding in his honour.

See also
 List of animal rights advocates

References

Sources

Further reading

External links

 Battle of Britain in the Words of Air Chief Marshal Hugh Dowding 

|-

|-

|-

|-

|-

|-

|-

|-

|-

|-

1882 births
1970 deaths
Aerial warfare pioneers
Anti-vivisectionists
Battle of Britain
British Army personnel of World War I
Burials at Westminster Abbey
Companions of the Order of St Michael and St George
Graduates of the Royal Military Academy, Woolwich
Graduates of the Staff College, Camberley
Knights Grand Cross of the Order of the Bath
Knights Grand Cross of the Royal Victorian Order
People educated at St Ninian's School, Moffat
People educated at Winchester College
People from Moffat
Parapsychologists
Royal Air Force air marshals of World War II
Royal Air Force generals of World War I
Royal Flying Corps officers
Royal Garrison Artillery officers
Scottish airmen
Scottish spiritualists
Scottish Theosophists
Barons created by George VI